"Papillon" is a song by English rock band Editors. It was released as the lead single from their third studio album, In This Light and on This Evening, on 12 October 2009. A music video for the song was released on 11 September 2009 and directed by Andrew Douglas. "Papillon" charted in several countries, including Belgium, where it was a number-one hit, and the UK, where it peaked at number 23, and as of 2020, remains their last UK Top 40 hit.

The song has regularly been used as "closing piece" of Editors concerts.

Music video
The official music video for "Papillon", lasting three minutes and fifty-five seconds, was uploaded on 11 September 2009 to the official Editors YouTube channel and was directed by Andrew Douglas. As of September 2019 it has received over 17 million views.

Track listing

7" vinyl
"Papillon (Radio Mix)" – 3:55
"Eat Raw Meat = Blood Drool (demo)" – 3:45

12" vinyl
"Papillon (Tiësto remix)" – 8:09
"Papillon (The Japanese Popstars remix)" - 7:12

CD (UK release)
"Papillon (Radio mix)" – 3:55
"Papillon (Tiësto remix)" – 8:09

CD (Euro-release - digipack)
"Papillon (Radio mix)" – 3:55
"Eat Raw Meat = Blood Drool (Demo version)" – 3:45
"Like Treasure (Demo version)" – 3:20
"Papillon (Tiësto Radio edit) – 4:09

iTunes EP - Non-UK
"Papillon (Radio mix)" – 3:55
"Papillon (Tiësto radio edit)" – 4:09
"Eat Raw Meat = Blood Drool (Demo version)" – 3:55
"Walk The Fleet Road (Demo version)" – 3:53
"Papillon (Tiësto remix)" – 8:09
"Papillon (The Japanese Popstars remix)" – 7:12

iTunes EP - UK
"Papillon (Radio mix)" – 3:55
"Papillon (Tiësto remix)" – 8:09
"Papillon (Tom Nevilles Sleep Twitch)" – 7:56
"Papillon (The Japanese Popstars remix)" – 7:12

Charts

Weekly charts

Year-end charts

Certifications

References

External links
 

2009 singles
2009 songs
Editors (band) songs
Song recordings produced by Flood (producer)
Ultratop 50 Singles (Flanders) number-one singles
Songs written by Chris Urbanowicz
Songs written by Edward Lay
Songs written by Russell Leetch
Songs written by Tom Smith (musician)